Singapore competed at the 2020 Winter Youth Olympics in Lausanne, Switzerland from 9 to 22 January 2020.

Singapore made it Winter Youth Olympics debut.

Ice hockey

Mixed NOC 3x3 tournament 

Boys
Matthew Hamnett

Short track speed skating

See also
Singapore at the 2020 Summer Olympics

References

2020 in Singaporean sport
Nations at the 2020 Winter Youth Olympics
Singapore at the Youth Olympics